Mykyta Tatarkov (born 4 January 1995) is a Ukrainian football forward who plays for Kryvbas Kryvyi Rih.

Career
Tatarkov is a product of the youth team system of FC Metalurh Zaporizhya. He made his debut for FC Metalurh entering as a first half-time substitution playing against FC Chornomorets Odesa on 6 April 2014 in the Ukrainian Premier League.

In January 2016 he signed a contract with another Ukrainian Premier League side FC Chornomorets Odesa.

References

External links
 
 
 

1995 births
Living people
Ukrainian footballers
Footballers from Zaporizhzhia
Association football forwards
Ukrainian expatriate footballers
Expatriate footballers in Belarus
Ukrainian expatriate sportspeople in Belarus
FC Metalurh Zaporizhzhia players
Ukrainian Premier League players
Ukraine youth international footballers
FC Chornomorets Odesa players
FC Shakhtyor Soligorsk players
FC Lviv players
FC Vorskla Poltava players
FC Pyunik players
Armenian Premier League players
Expatriate footballers in Armenia
Ukrainian expatriate sportspeople in Armenia